Sandnessjøen or Stamnes is a former municipality in Nordland county, Norway.  The  municipality existed from 1899 until its dissolution in 1965.  The municipality encompassed the northern part of the island of Alsten in what is now Alstahaug Municipality.  Originally, it (briefly) also included all of what is now Leirfjord Municipality as well.  The administrative centre of the municipality was the town of Sandnessjøen.

History

The municipality of Stamnes was established on 1 July 1899 when it was split off from Alstahaug Municipality.  Originally, it consisted of the northern part of the island of Alsta and the mainland area around the Leirfjorden.  Initially, Stamnes had 2,673 residents.  On 1 July 1915, the mainland district of Stamnes (population: 2,003) was separated to form the new Leirfjord Municipality.  This left Stamnes with 1,059 residents.

In 1948, the municipality of Stamnes was renamed Sandnessjøen after the main town in the small municipality.  During the 1960s, there were many municipal mergers across Norway due to the work of the Schei Committee.  On 1 January 1965, the municipality of Sandnessjøen (population: 3,856) was merged with most of Alstahaug Municipality (population: 970) and most of Tjøtta Municipality (population: 1,477) to form a new, larger Alstahaug Municipality.

Name
The municipality is named after the old Stamnes farm since the first Stamnes Church was built there. Thus it is referring to the large mast-like peninsula on which the village of Stamnes was located.

In 1948, the municipal name was changed to Sandnessjøen, after the main town in the municipality. The town was named after the old Sandnes farm since the town grew up on the grounds of the old farm. The last element (-sjøen) was added on after the name of the farm. This word  which means "the sea", thus it is the "sandy peninsula along the sea".

Government
While it existed, this municipality was responsible for primary education (through 10th grade), outpatient health services, senior citizen services, unemployment, social services, zoning, economic development, and municipal roads. During its existence, this municipality was governed by a municipal council of elected representatives, which in turn elected a mayor.

Municipal council
The municipal council  of Sandnessjøen was made up of representatives that were elected to four year terms.  The party breakdown of the final municipal council was as follows:

See also
List of former municipalities of Norway

References

Alstahaug
Former municipalities of Norway
1899 establishments in Norway
1965 disestablishments in Norway